Jean Elias Peixoto commonly known as Jean Elias (born December 5, 1969) is a former Brazilian football player.

Career
Born in Alegre, Jean Elias began playing football as a defender with local side Desportiva Ferroviária. He would play professionally in Brazil and Japan, making over 40 appearances in the Campeonato Brasileiro for Esporte Clube Bahia and Cruzeiro Esporte Clube. He is well known for delivering a violent tackle on Vasco's Pedrinho while playing for Cruzeiro in 1998.

Club statistics

References

External links

cerezo-museum.com 

1969 births
Living people
Brazilian footballers
Brazilian expatriate footballers
J1 League players
Cerezo Osaka players
Desportiva Ferroviária players
Cruzeiro Esporte Clube players
Esporte Clube Bahia players
Expatriate footballers in Japan
Brazilian expatriate sportspeople in Japan
People from Alegre, Espírito Santo
Association football defenders
Sportspeople from Espírito Santo